The 1949 Brown Bears football team represented Brown University during the 1949 college football season. In their sixth and final season under head coach Charles "Rip" Engle, the Bears compiled an 8–1 record, and outscored their opponents 263 to 94. Joe Paterno and J. S. Scott were the team captains. Brown played its home games at Brown Stadium in Providence, Rhode Island.

Schedule

References

Brown
Brown Bears football seasons
Brown Bears football